When Saturday Comes is a 1996 British film directed by Maria Giese and starring Sean Bean and Emily Lloyd. The film was released in March 1996, and was distributed by Guild Film Distribution. The soundtrack includes a variety of classic music tracks as well as newly commissioned songs. The score was composed by Anne Dudley and the soundtrack includes contributions from Tony Hadley of Spandau Ballet and Sheffield artists including Def Leppard's Joe Elliott who performs on two new tracks: "When Saturday Comes" and the instrumental "Jimmy's Theme". Both were performed with bandmates Rick Savage and Phil Collen. According to Elliott, he had a part in the film as the brother of Sean Bean's character, but the part was cut from the final film.

Plot
Jimmy Muir, a worker at the Stones Brewery gets scouted, firstly by the well-known non-league side Hallam F.C. and then later by Sheffield United Football Club. It was filmed at various locations around South Yorkshire including Rotherham, Sandygate Road and Bramall Lane. Def Leppard lead singer Joe Elliott made his acting debut in a scene as Jimmy's brother, but the scene was cut from the final production.

A sequel has been written, which would see Sean Bean reprise his role as Jimmy Muir.

Cast
Sean Bean – Jimmy Muir
Emily Lloyd – Annie Doherty
Craig Kelly – Russel Muir
Melanie Hill – Mary Muir
John McEnery – Joe Muir
Ann Bell – Sarah Muir
Ian Taylor – Jimmy Muir as kid
Tony Currie – Tony Currie
Mel Sterland – Captain Sheffield United
Pete Postlethwaite – Ken Jackson
Rebecca Nichols – Stripper
Chris Walker – Mac
John Higgins – Rob
Tim Gallagher – Steve
Peter Gunn – Tommy
Nick Waring – Gerry
James McKenna – George McCabe
Daniel Oldham – Street Footballing Kid
David Gibbons – Boy on bus
Lucy Rodgers – Debbie
Tracy Shaw – Tina
Martin Tyler - Commentator

Reception
When Saturday Comes opened on 1 March 1996 in the UK on 174 screens and grossed £245,936 in its opening weekend, placing at sixth at the UK box office. It went on to gross £722,934 in the UK.

References

External links 
 When Saturday Comes Filming Locations|When Saturday Comes Filming Locations
 
 
 

1996 films
1990s sports films
British association football films
Films set in Sheffield
Sheffield United F.C.
Films shot in England
1990s English-language films
Films scored by Anne Dudley
1996 directorial debut films
1990s British films